The mineral khmaralite is a beryllium bearing mineral of the sapphirine group with a chemical formula of . It is most associated with sillimanite, surinamite, musgravite, garnet, and biotite. The known color is a dark greenish blue or a dark green, with a colorless streak. It is transparent with a vitreous luster with no cleavage and a Moh's hardness of 7. It is brittle with an uneven fracture. The calculated density is 3.61 g/cm3.

Khmaralite is closely related to sapphirine with a difference in the tetrahedral sequence chain. The tetrahedral sequence chain in sapphirine (Al-Si-Al) is replaced by the sequence Si-Be-Si in khmaralite. Si is replaced by Be on two sites, and Al is replaced by Si on four adjacent sites. This creates an indirect replacement of Al by Be.

Occurrence
Khmaralite was found in "Zircon Point" on Khmara Bay, Enderby Land, Antarctica and occurs in a metamorphosed pegmatite. It is named after the area that it was found, which was named in the honor of Ivan Fedorovich Khmara who was a tractor driver that died in Antarctica.

The associated minerals with khamralite (sillimanite, surinamite, musgravite, garnet, and biotite) saturated it in BeO, allowing the BeO content to be close to the maximum possible. This is a rare instance, and has not been located elsewhere.

Chemical composition
Barbier et al. analyzed khmaralite for constituents other than Li, Be and B with an ARL-EMX electron microprobe using 15 kV accelerating voltage and a 20 nA sample current. Li, Be and B were analyzed with an ARL Ion Microprobe Mass Analyzer (IMMA). It was later found in 1996 while using a Camea ims 4f (Secondary Ion Mass Spectroscopy or SIMS) that the 9Be+ signal was not corrected for the 27Al+ signal in the IMMA data. The IMMA and SIMS BeO contents are respectively, 2.56 and 2.47 weight percent.

Chemical composition by weight percent 

(*Fe was analyzed as Fe2+; FeO and Fe2O3 were calculated assuming 28 cations in a formula for 40 O atoms.)

Crystallography

Khmaralite has a superstructure that is best described as a doubled sapphirine unit cell because the an axis is in the direction of the tetrahedral chains along which the main cation ordering occurs.

There are rows of weak extra reflections that correspond to a doubling of the an axis. These patterns are indexed by the unit cell (P21/c): a = 19.8, b = 14.4, c = 11.2 Å, β = 125°. These were found using electron diffraction and microscopy. The superstructure was also observed in a medium-resolution lattice along the [001] axis. There was also a slight comparison made between the superstructure and the thicker regions of the crystals corresponding to a double100 interplanar spacing equal to 16.1 Å.

The powdered x-ray diffraction pattern had a slightly different conclusion but relatively the same as the electron diffraction and microscopy end numbers. The powder pattern was indexed on a monoclinic unit cell and the absences consistent with the P21/c space group were found. The unit cell was similar to the electron diffraction and microscopy: a = 19.794(8), b =
14.367(5), c = 11.320(3) Å, β = 125.49(4)°. But there was an unexplained 0.066 Å difference in the c parameters. The reflections that correspond to the 2xa superstructure are not visible in the powder x-ray pattern of khmaralite. The intensity of the strongest super-cell reflection is only 0.4% of that of the most intense sub-cell reflection.

These experiments were then refined, and corrected displaying the notable 2xa superstructure of khmaralite.

Distinguishing from sapphirine-2M
The major differences between khmaralite and sapphirine-2M are the presence of a 2xa superstructure and the larger count of Be at one tetrahedral site. Khmaralite and sapphirine-2M cannot be distinguished by optical properties alone because the internal effects of Be on the crystal structure are covered by the effect of Fe substitution for Mg and Al. But the presence of 2 wt% or more of BeO indicates a likely advocate for khmaralite. Confirmation is available by using electron diffraction to see if there is a presence of a superstructure.

References

External links
Article on Khmaralite, From American Mineralogist

Monoclinic minerals
Minerals in space group 14
Inosilicates